Escanaba Senior High School (also known as EHS or simply Esky) is a public high school in Escanaba, Michigan. It is the sole high school in the Escanaba Area Public Schools district, and serves grades 9–12.

Demographics 
The demographic breakdown of the 786 students enrolled in 2018-19 was:

 Male - 48.6%
 Female - 51.4%
 Native American - 3.9%
 Asian - 0.4%
 Black - 0.4%
 Hispanic - 0.9%
 White - 92.9%
 Multiracial - 1.5%

In addition, 40.7% of students were eligible for reduced-price or free lunch.

Notable alumni 

 Tom Casperson, politician
 Josh Parisian, UFC mixed martial artist
 Kevin Tapani, Major League Baseball player
 Chauncey W. Yockey, Milwaukee attorney and politician

References

External links 

 Official website

Public high schools in Michigan
Education in Delta County, Michigan